2008 Monza GP2 Series round was the final race of the 2008 GP2 Series season. It was held on September 13 and 14, 2008 at Autodromo Nazionale Monza at Monza, Italy. The race was used as a support race to the 2008 Italian Grand Prix.

Classification

Qualifying

Feature race

Sprint race

References

GP2 round
Monza